Luisa Fernandez (born 14 August 1961) is a Spanish-born, Germany based pop singer. She is perhaps best known for her hit single, "Lay Love on You" from 1978.

Career

She was born in Vigo, Spain, but moved to Germany as a child. She later married singer/producer Peter Kent, who was also popular during the disco era.

Singles

 "Lay Love on You" GER #8
 "Give Love a Second Chance" GER #11
●   Stop 1978

References

Living people
1961 births
German pop singers
German people of Spanish descent
Spanish pop singers
People from Vigo